The Coomera Falls is a segmented waterfall on the upper Coomera River in the South East region of Queensland, Australia.

Location and features
Located to the west of the Border Track, the falls descend  into Coomera Gorge. Access is via graded walking tracks in Lamington National Park that commence from Binna Burra. Also located in close proximity to the falls are the Bahnamboola Falls and the Neerigomindalala Falls.

The Coomera Circuit, a  walking track within the national park that provides ideal viewing of the falls, was rated in 2010 by the Australian Geographic Outdoor magazine as the second best day walk in Australia.

See also

 List of waterfalls of Queensland

References

External links

Waterfalls of Queensland
South East Queensland
Segmented waterfalls